II liga zapad is the third studio album by the Serbian punk rock band Atheist Rap, released by Hi-Fi Centar in 1998.

Track listing 
Music and lyrics by Atheist Rap. The song "Tomi Gan" features the theme from The Clash song "Tommy Gun".

Personnel 
 Leki (Zoran Lekić; bass)
 Acke (Aleksandar Milovanov; drums)
 Goja (Stevan Gojkov; guitar)
 Radule (Vladimir Radusinović; guitar, vocals)
 Dr. Pop (Aleksandar Popov; vocals)
 Pećinko (Vladimir Kozbašić; vocals)

External links 
 EX YU ROCK enciklopedija 1960-2006, Janjatović Petar; 
 Official site discography page

Atheist Rap albums
1998 albums
Hi-Fi Centar albums